Rossella Callovi (born 5 April 1991) is an Italian professional road and track racing cyclist. On the track she won as a junior the bronze medal in the Junior Women's Team Pursuit at the 2008 UEC European Track Championships. At the 2010 European Track Championships she competed in the women's team pursuit. On the road she won as a junior the silver medal in the road race at the 2008 junior world championships and the gold medal in the road race at 2009 junior world championships in Moscow. At the 2010 UCI Road World Championships she competed in the women's road race.

See also
 Pasta Zara-Cogeas

References

External links
 

1991 births
Living people
Italian female cyclists
Place of birth missing (living people)
People from Cles
Sportspeople from Trentino
Cyclists from Trentino-Alto Adige/Südtirol